Senja LRT station is an elevated Light Rail Transit (LRT) station on the Bukit Panjang LRT line in Bukit Panjang, Singapore, located at the junction of Bukit Panjang Ring Road and Senja Road.

Etymology
The station is located near Senja Road. Senja means "dusk" or "twilight" in Malay.

References

External links

Railway stations in Singapore opened in 1999
Bukit Panjang
LRT stations of Bukit Panjang LRT Line
Light Rail Transit (Singapore) stations